Anton Chekhov-class motorship is a class of Russian river passenger ships. It is named after Anton Chekhov.

Four-deck cruise ships manufactured in Austria, 1978–1979.

River cruise ships of the Austrian project Q-056

Overview

References

See also
 Rossiya-class motorship (1952)
 Rossiya-class motorship (1973)
 Dmitriy Furmanov-class motorship
 Valerian Kuybyshev-class motorship
 Rodina-class motorship
 Baykal-class motorship
 Maksim Gorkiy-class motorship

River cruise ships
Ships of Russia
Ships of the Soviet Union
Austria–Soviet Union relations
Anton Chekhov